Noah Fuson (born December 31, 1999) is an American professional soccer player who plays as a forward for MLS Next Pro club Columbus Crew 2.

Career

Youth
Fuson moved from California to the i2i Academy in England in 2018.

Professional
On August 17, 2020, Fuson signed with USL League One club Forward Madison FC. He made his professional debut on August 19, 2020, appearing as a 71st-minute substitute during a 1–1 draw with Union Omaha.

On February 18, 2022, Fuson joined Columbus Crew 2, the reserve side of Major League Soccer's Columbus Crew, ahead of their inaugural MLS Next Pro season.

Honors
Columbus Crew 2
MLS Next Pro: 2022

References

External links
 

2000 births
Living people
American soccer players
Association football forwards
Forward Madison FC players
Soccer players from California
Sportspeople from Glendale, California
USL League One players
Columbus Crew 2 players
MLS Next Pro players